Saint Georges is an unincorporated town and former municipality situated on the Chesapeake and Delaware Canal in New Castle County, Delaware, United States, approximately midway between the Delaware River and Chesapeake Bay.

History
St. Georges was settled before 1730 at the head of the St. Georges Creek. A tavern was built in 1735 and King's Highway was constructed through the settlement in 1762. St. Georges was incorporated as a town in 1825. After being divided by the Chesapeake and Delaware Canal and then bypassed by a newer bridge, the town asked to have their charter revoked by the state in 1940. The community has at least one civic association, the North Saint Georges Civic Association which represents the community to the New Castle County Council.

The Senator William V. Roth Jr. Bridge (Delaware Route 1) passes just west of the community. It is the only cable-stayed bridge in the Delaware Valley and one of the first in the nation. It opened in 1995 as a replacement to the still standing St. Georges Bridge, which carries U.S. Route 13 over the community of St. Georges and the canal. The St. Georges Bridge is in turn a replacement for a former lift bridge that sat in the middle of town. That bridge—built in 1923—was knocked down on January 10, 1939, by the 6,000-ton freighter Waukegan. The freighter lost control, hit the north tower of the bridge, and caused it to collapse.  Two people died: the bridge tender and the bridge electrician. One other bridge spanned the C & D Canal before the lift bridge.  It was a small pedestrian swing bridge that crossed over the former Saint Georges Locks. It was destroyed when the locks were dismantled during the first widening and deepening (to sea level) of the canal.

Bloomfield, the W. Casperson House, Linden Hill, Ethel S. Roy House, St. Georges Cemetery Caretaker's House, St. Georges Presbyterian Church, Starl House, Sutton House (St. Georges, Delaware), and the North Saint Georges Historic District are listed on the National Register of Historic Places.

The community is located in New Castle County District 12 and is represented to the county council by Councilman James W. (Bill) Bell.

Demographics

Education
Saint Georges is in the Colonial School District. It operates William Penn High School.

See also
Ethel S. Roy House

References

External links

Unincorporated communities in New Castle County, Delaware
Unincorporated communities in Delaware
Chesapeake & Delaware Canal